Sheikh Ali Madad  was a Parachinar Pakistani Shia Muslim religious leader and politician born in Gilgit. He died on 28 June 2002, and was succeeded by Muhammad Nawaz Irfani.

See also
 Sheikh Rajab Ali
 Muhammad Nawaz Irfani
 Arif Hussain Hussaini
 Sheikh Fida Hussain Muzahiri

2002 deaths
Anti-Americanism
Pakistani exiles
Pakistani religious leaders
Shia scholars of Islam
People from Gilgit
Pakistani Shia clerics